Konstantinos is the name of a practicing occultist and neopagan and the author of seven spiritual and occult books on nocturnal witchcraft, all published by Llewellyn Worldwide.

Konstantinos has been working on occult and paranormal topics for over twenty years. He has been a guest on various shows and documentaries. He has also written numerous articles over the years. He appeared on Coast to Coast AM hosted by George Noory.

Bibliography
 Konstantinos. Gothic Grimoire. St. Paul, Minn:Llewellyn Publications, 2002. 
 Konstantinos. Nocturnal Witchcraft: Magick After Dark. St. Paul, Minn:Llewellyn Publications, 2002. 
 Konstantinos. Summoning Spirits: The Art of Magical Evocation. St. Paul, Minn:Llewellyn Publications, 1995. 
 Konstantinos. Vampires: The Occult Truth. St. Paul, Minn:Llewellyn Publications, 1996. 
 Konstantinos. Speak With the Dead: Seven Methods for Spirit Communication. St. Paul, Minn:Llewellyn Publications, 2004. 
 Konstantinos. Nocturnicon: Calling Dark Forces and Powers. St. Paul, Minn:Llewellyn Publications, 2005. 
 Konstantinos, Werewolves: The Occult Truth. Llewellyn Worldwide, 2010. 
 Konstantinos, Contact the Other Side: 7 Methods for Afterlife Communication. 2001.

References

External links

Llewellyn author bio

1972 births
Living people
American occult writers
American people of Greek descent
American occultists
20th-century occultists
21st-century occultists